Stadionul Tineretului is a multi-use stadium in Lugoj, Romania. It is used mostly for football matches and is the home ground of CSM Lugoj. The stadium holds 6,000 people.

References

External links
Stadionul Tineretului at soccerway.com

Football venues in Romania
Buildings and structures in Lugoj
Buildings and structures in Timiș County